Gelora Joko Samudro is a multi-purpose stadium in the town of Kebomas, Gresik Regency, East Java, Indonesia. It is mostly used for football matches and is the new home stadium of Gresik United. The stadium hold 40,000 spectators.

Sport events
2018 AFF U-19 Youth Championship
2018 AFF U-15 Youth Championship

References

Gresik Regency
Gresik United
Buildings and structures in East Java
Multi-purpose stadiums in Indonesia
Football venues in Indonesia